Charisse Melany Moll (born July 27, 1985) is a beauty pageant contestant who represented Suriname in Miss World 2007 in China.

References

Miss World 2007 delegates
Living people
1985 births
Surinamese beauty pageant winners
Surinamese female models
People from Paramaribo